This article details the qualifying phase for table tennis at the 2024 Summer Olympics.  The competition will comprise a total of 172 table tennis players, with an equal distribution between men and women coming from the different NOCs, similar to those in the previous editions. Each NOC can enter a maximum of six table tennis players across five medal events (men's and women's singles; men's and women's teams, and mixed doubles) with a maximum of two each for the men's and women's singles.As the host nation, France reserves a spot each in the men's and women's teams, respectively, with one per gender competing in the singles tournament; and in the mixed doubles.

Each team event features a draw of sixteen NOCs with a trio of table tennis players. The initial half of the total quota will be awarded to the quarterfinalists at the 2024 ITTF World Teams Championships, scheduled for February 16 to 25 in Busan, South Korea, while six continental qualification tournaments (Africa, Asia, Europe, and Oceania, with the Americas divided between North and Latin for an ITTF competition) will offer the men's and women's team spot each to the top-ranked NOC from a respective continent. Apart from the host nation, the remaining slot will be attributed to the highest-ranked eligible NOC based on the ITTF World Team Ranking list of March 2024.

The mixed doubles tournament shares the same amount with the teams, consisting of sixteen NOCs with a pair of table tennis players. The initial quarter of the total quota will be awarded to the semifinalists of the designated qualifying meet, scheduled for March or April 2024, while six continental qualification tournaments (Africa, Asia, Europe, and Oceania, with the Americas divided between North and Latin for an ITTF competition) will offer the mixed doubles spot each to the top-ranked NOC from a respective continent. Apart from the host nation, the five highest-ranked eligible pairs will obtain the remaining berths to complete the field based on the ITTF World Ranking list of May 7, 2024.

About 70 table tennis players may participate in the men's and women's singles, depending on the number of slots available after the distribution of the mixed doubles quota. Each NOC can enter a maximum of four table tennis players (two per gender). Thirty-two places are reserved for each of the qualified men's and women's teams, with twenty-two more attributed to the individuals coming from NOCs without a qualified team through the continental meets organized by ITTF (four for Africa, six each for Asia and Europe, five for the Americas, and one for Oceania). A maximum of fifteen table tennis players will secure a spot through the ITTF World Singles Ranking list of June 18, 2024, respecting the four-player (two per gender) NOC limit, while the remaining men's and women's singles spots are entitled to the eligible NOCs interested to have their table tennis players compete for Paris 2024 under the Universality system.

Summary

Timeline
The following table outlines a timeline of the qualification events for table tennis at the 2024 Summer Olympics.

Events

Men's team

Women's team

Mixed doubles

Men's singles

Women's singles

References

Qualification for the 2024 Summer Olympics
Table tennis at the 2024 Summer Olympics